Rosenthal's reagent is a metallocene bis(trimethylsilyl)acetylene complex with zirconium (Cp2Zr) or titanium (Cp2Ti) used as central atom of the metallocene fragment Cp2M. Additional ligands such as pyridine or THF are commonly used as well. With zirconium as central atom and pyridine as ligand, a dark purple to black solid with a melting point of 125–126 °C is obtained. Synthesizing Rosenthal's reagent of a titanocene source yields golden-yellow crystals of the titanocene bis(trimethylsilyl)acetylene complex with a melting point of 81–82 °C. This reagent enables the generation of the themselves unstable titanocene and zirconocene under mild conditions.

The reagent is named after the German chemist  (born 1950) and was first synthesized by him and his co-workers in 1995.

Synthesis 
Rosenthal's reagent can be prepared by reduction of titanocene or zirconocene dichloride with magnesium in the presence of bis(trimethylsilyl)acetylene in THF. The illustrated product for a titanocene complex can be represented by the resonance structures A and B. If zirconium is used as central atom, additional ligands (e.g. pyridine) are necessary for stabilization.

Application and reactions 
The main area of application is the synthesis of synthetically challenging organic structures such as macrocycles and heterometallacycles. Rosenthal's reagent allows the selective preparation of these compounds with high yields.

Currently, Rosenthal's reagent is often used instead of Negishi's reagent (1-butene)zirconocene to generate zirconocene fragments as it offers a number of compelling advantages. Unlike Negishi's reagent, Rosenthal's reagent is stable at room temperature and can be stored indefinitely under an inert atmosphere. A much more precise control over the stoichiometry of reactions is possible, especially because the instable (1-butene)zirconocene cannot be formed quantitatively. Stoichiometric and catalytic reactions can be performed and influenced by the use of different ligands, metals and substrate substituents. While for titanium complexes, a dissociative reaction mechanism has been observed, zirconium complexes favor an associative pathway. The combination of these organometallic complexes with different suitable substrates (e.g. carbonyl compounds, acetylenes, imines, azoles, etc.) often leads to novel bond types and reactivities. A particularly interesting aspect is the novel C–C coupling reaction of nitriles to form precursors for the realization of so far unknown heterometallacycles. As main side products of coupling reactions with Rosenthal's reagent, pyridine and bis(trimethylsilyl)acetylene are obtained. These compounds are soluble and volatile, and therefore easy to remove from the product mixture.

References 

Organometallic compounds
Organozirconium compounds
Organotitanium compounds
Trimethylsilyl compounds
Zirconium(IV) compounds
Titanium(IV) compounds